Battleworld is a fictional patchwork planet appearing in American comic books published by Marvel Comics.

Publication history
The first Battleworld debuted in the Secret Wars crossover where it was created by Jim Shooter and Mike Zeck.

The second Battleworld debuted in Beyond! and was created by Dwayne McDuffie and Scott Kolins.

The third Battleworld debuted in Secret Wars #2 and was created by Jonathan Hickman and Esad Ribić.

Fictional planet biography

First Battleworld
The Beyonder merged dozens of fragments from many planets (including a suburb of Denver, Colorado, from Earth), to create Battleworld, intended to provide an unfamiliar environment where all contestants could use their powers to the fullest. Many peoples, both alien and human, were brought along "for the ride" by this method; it was because of this that Spider-Woman II was on Battleworld, as was Zsaji, the healer, who had brief romances with both the Human Torch of the Fantastic Four and Colossus of the X-Men.

In the aftermath of Secret Wars, the planet became infected with cosmic energy when the Beyonder reclaimed his stolen power from Doctor Doom. This led to a "wish fulfillment" phenomenon whereby force of will could alter reality; for example, repairing Captain America's unbreakable shield or allowing Mister Fantastic to create a way to take them quickly home. This is may be due to the Beyonder's nature as an incomplete Cosmic Cube, which allows the wielder to alter reality by force of will, or was an aspect of the "heart's desire" promised by the Beyonder and granted to the winners of the Secret Wars. All the heroes left the planet, except for Ben Grimm. He stayed behind because he was able to change to and from his human form while on the planet's surface; his adventures were recounted in his own side-series while She-Hulk took his place in the Fantastic Four. After Ben returned home—he had defeated Ultron and slain his manifested dark side Grimm the Sorcerer— the planet had no more reason to exist and broke apart.

It is unknown whether all pieces returned to their home planets; the fragment of Colorado was ferried back to Earth with its citizens and the Secret Wars villains by Molecule Man.

Second Battleworld
A Battleworld appeared in the miniseries Beyond!. It was constructed by the Stranger posing as the Beyonder for the purposes of studying various combatants from Earth under the guise of battle. This faux Battleworld was destroyed at the end of the miniseries by the departure of the irate Stranger with Gravity holding it together long enough for his group to escape at the cost of his life. Gravity was later resurrected by Epoch as the new Protector of the Universe.

Third Battleworld
A third Battleworld appeared in the 2015 Secret Wars storyline, after the numerous incursions destroyed the Multiverse. The remains of several realities were all merged to form a new Battleworld with the planet having a roundish shape. All of these realities are known as domains which are ruled by an appointed "Baron" or a "Baroness", and while most domains have the ability to interact with each other, the borders of each domain are clearly defined and travel between different domains is discouraged, as it requires special dispensation from the local Baron or from Doctor Doom himself. Only the Deadlands (which contains the Marvel Zombies), Perfection (which contains the Ultron Sentinels), and New Xandar (which contains the Annihilation Wave) are separated from the rest by the Shield (a giant version of Ben Grimm) because each contains threats that if loosed would destroy the other domains. This new Battleworld was created by its ruler Doctor Doom (who is worshipped as its deity God Emperor Doom) after he and Doctor Strange (who became Battleworld's sheriff) went to the Beyonders to stop the incursion of their reality. Although Doctor Strange didn't kill the Beyonders during the confrontation, Doctor Doom appears to do so by using a secret weapon, actually thousands of Molecule Man, that allowed Doom to take the Beyonders' power as his own and incorporated the remnants of the realities destroyed by the incursions, or more precisely, their incursions points, to create his own image of Battleworld with Strange unable to do anything else but to follow his words.

Battleworld is enforced by the Thor Corps who serve as Battleworld's police force who answer to God Emperor Doom. Battleworld is orbited by a small Sun, in fact the Human Torch, consigned to the role for acting against Doctor Doom. Knowhere acts as Battleworld's moon. Besides these two and Battleworld itself, there were originally no more celestial bodies in its universe until Singularity, a mysterious young girl who actually represents a pocket universe that gained sentience during the multiversal collapse, appears to give her life to save the citizens of Arcadia from a horde of Zombies which made the stars appear in the sky.

This Battleworld would eventually collapse after God Emperor Doom's Beyonders' power was transferred to Reed Richards, who was considered by Doom himself and Molecule Man to be more worthy, and rectified the artificial reality.

As part of the "All-New, All-Different Marvel" event, it's revealed that the reality where Battleworld was fashioned was identified as Earth-15513 and became a distorted portion of time and space after the destruction of the planet, however due to Battleworld's reality having been the epicenter of this Multiversal renewal, it became rich in a substance known as Iso-8, a material identified as the byproduct of creation itself. When the Elders of the Universe of the restored Earth-616 realized that the Multiverse had endured a death and a rebirth, the Collector and Grandmaster discovered the remnants of Battleworld and resolved to fight for the possession of the Iso-8 and used the broken shell as the arena (known as Battlerealm) for their Contest of Champions, a competition where several individuals, taken from Battleworld and the reborn Multiverse, fought to the death on behalf of each Elder. The highest prize was the Iso-Sphere which contained within the Power Primordial, the concentrated and most powerful form of the Iso-8. After assuming control of the Power Primordial that the Grandmaster and Collector were competing for, the Battleworld version of Maestro recreates Battleworld to its previous form as he had previously vowed that he would become the God-King of Battleworld. In order to combat the remaining players, Maestro summoned the remnants of the Avengers and Thunderbolts from an alternate reality where Iron Man became President of the United States after winning the superhuman civil war as well as summoning Sentry of Earth-1611 in order to deal with the remaining Contest of Champions competitors. When the Iso-Sphere was stolen from Maestro by Outlaw, he used its power to banish Maestro away from Battleworld and teleport the contestants to wherever they wanted to be. As a consequence of Outlaw wishing that the Contest of Champions to end, the Iso-Sphere shattered. A group of the contestants decided to remain in Battleworld forming the Civil Warriors in order to guard the Iso-8 and the shards of the Iso-Sphere so they wouldn't fall into the wrong hands.

Known locations
First Battleworld

 Baxter Building - A replica of the Baxter Building where Thing had his final battle with Grimm the Sorcerer.
 Leenn - A location of Battleworld taken from Thing's subconscious that was based on Latveria. Thing fought a variation of Doctor Doom called the Wizard. Ray allen for 3. It vanished when Thing destroyed the device that the Wizard was guarding.
 Muab - A kingdom of white magic that was attacked by Grimm the Sorcerer.

Third Battleworld
The following is a list of the domains and the Marvel Comics event titles that are their basis or reimagining as fully revealed on Marvel Comics' Interactive Battleworld map in Secret Wars #2:

In other media
Television
 Battleworld appears in the Spider-Man three-part episode "Secret Wars". This version is an alien planet populated with peaceful inhabitants who did not know war or villainy until the Beyonder took several of Earth's supervillains and introduced them to the planet to test Spider-Man's ability to save the multiverse from Spider-Carnage. Over time, the supervillains divided it into several territories, with one known location being "Octavia", which was ruled by Doctor Octopus until Doctor Doom overthrew him and renamed the territory "New Latveria".
 Battleworld appears in Avengers Assemble. Introduced in the episode "Beyond", this version is created by the Beyonder using parts from Earth, Asgard, and other realities as part of an "experiment". Known domains include the desert-like Egyptia, the subterranean NYC Underworld, No-Tech Land, the Vampire Federation, K'un-Lun, the Vibranium Coast, the pirate-populated Red Skull Sea, the magic-based Weirdworld ruled by Morgan le Fey, the Bay of Attuma, the Old West-themed dinosaur-populated Westland, a domain simply called "Lost to the Symbiotes", and the United States of Crime.

Video games
 Battleworld appears in Marvel Contest of Champions and its spin-off Marvel Realm of Champions. Each of the Battleworld domains are led by different houses and include the Land of the Free, the Nine Realms, Manhattan, Wakanda, the Iron Nation, the Isles of Agamotto, Egyptia, and the Green Desert.
 A variation of Battleworld, renamed Primary Earth''', appears in Marvel Future Revolution. This version was the result of Vision sacrificing himself to save his Earth from multiverse destroying incursions and consists of New Stark City, the Hydra Empire, Xandearth, Midgardia, Sakaar, the Savage Shadowland, and the Dark Domain.

Miscellaneous

Funko released a collectible card game called Marvel Battleworld, which is loosely inspired by the Secret Wars'' comic book events. Known domains listed in the game include Earth, Asgard, the Deadlands, and an unnamed anthropomorphic animal-populated domain based on Spider-Ham's universe.

References

External links
 Battleworld at Marvel.com
 Battleworld I at Marvel Wiki
 Battleworld III at Marvel Wiki

Marvel Comics planets
Comics by Jonathan Hickman